Mataking Island is a Malaysian island located in the Celebes Sea on the state of Sabah. Mataking Island is home to the first 'Underwater Post Office' in Malaysia and is connected to Pulau Mataking Kecil (Small Mataking Island) via a narrow sand bank. Mataking Island is a private island belonging to the Reef Dive Resort featuring luxury chalets and a dive center serving divers visiting Sipadan.

See also
 List of islands of Malaysia

References

External links 
 Mataking Island Official Website
 

Islands of Sabah
Private islands of Malaysia